Nevada Landing was a hotel and casino designed to resemble two riverboats. It was located in Jean, Nevada, United States, near the California state line, within a quarter mile of Interstate 15. The hotel, owned by MGM Resorts International, had 303 hotel rooms, four restaurants, over 800 slot machines (including video poker), live keno, table games, banquet facilities, and wedding services. The property was typically marketed with its sister hotel, the Gold Strike Hotel and Gambling Hall, still located across the I-15 freeway.

History

The casino opened in 1989, built by a partnership that included David Belding, Mike Ensign and William Richardson. It was first owned by Gold Strike Resorts and in 1995 was sold to Circus Circus Enterprises. Circus Circus Enterprises became Mandalay Resort Group in 1999, and in 2004 was acquired by MGM Mirage.

In February 2007, MGM announced plans to close the casino on April 18 and build a master-planned community on the  it owned in the area, in a joint venture with American Nevada Corporation and the Cloobeck Companies. The community was to include affordable housing, commercial businesses, shops, and a new hotel-casino. The Gold Strike would remain open, at least until the new hotel-casino was completed.

The hotel casino closed a month earlier than planned on March 20, 2007.

Demolition began on the hotel in early March 2008. By April 2008, the hotel was no longer standing. The tall Nevada Landing sign by Interstate 15 was demolished in 2010.

References

External links
 
 Amateur video footage of Nevada Landing prior to closing (YouTube)

Jean, Nevada
Casinos in Clark County, Nevada
Hotels in Clark County, Nevada
Casino hotels
Defunct casinos in Nevada
Defunct hotels in Nevada
Demolished hotels in Clark County, Nevada
Casinos completed in 1989
Hotel buildings completed in 1989
Hotels established in 1989
MGM Resorts International
Mandalay Resort Group
Hotels disestablished in 2007
1989 establishments in Nevada
2007 disestablishments in Nevada
Buildings and structures demolished in 2008
Buildings and structures demolished in 2010